Ci Tian (born 12 October 1996) is a Chinese footballer who plays as a forward for Chinese club a Tianjin Dajili.

Career

Before the second half of 2016–2017, Ci signed for the reserves of German Bundesliga side Werder Bremen. In 2018, he signed for Cangzhou Mighty Lions in the Chinese second division. In 2021, he signed for Chinese third division club Shaoxing Keqiao Yuejia. On 31 July 2021, Ci debuted for Shaoxing Keqiao Yuejia during a 1–1 draw with Hebei Kungfu.

References

External links
 
 

Chinese footballers
Living people
Expatriate footballers in Germany
1996 births
Association football forwards
Chinese expatriate footballers
Sportspeople from Baoding
Chinese expatriate sportspeople in Germany
SV Werder Bremen II players